GG Lupi is an eclipsing binary star in the southern constellation of Lupus. Most of the time it is a magnitude 5.6 object, making it faintly visible to the naked eye, but during the primary eclipse its brightness falls to 6.1. GG Lupi is located 1/2 degree (one full moon diameter) west of the 3rd magnitude star Delta Lupi.

This star was found to be a spectroscopic binary in 1930, and its eclipses were detected in observations during 1964. Its location in the sky, distance (~490 light years) and proper motion make it a likely member of the Scorpius–Centaurus Association within the Gould's Belt star formation region.
The two stars comprising this binary are both very young main sequence stars of spectral type B. They are estimated to be about 20 million years old, placing them near the zero-age main sequence. Their orbit is somewhat eccentric (e=0.15) and the period of apsidal precession is 102 years.

References

Spectroscopic binaries
Algol variables
135876
74950
Lupi, GG
B-type main-sequence stars
5687
Lupus (constellation)